George John Bonnor (25 February 1855 – 27 June 1912) was an Australian cricketer, known for his big hitting, who played Test cricket between 1880 and 1888.

Career
Bonnor was born in Bathurst, New South Wales, and made his international debut in the first match played in England in 1880. Being very tall for the 19th century at 6 foot 6 inches he was also exceedingly strong and made the most of it with some powerful hitting, however at times his cavalier attitude led to some periods of poor scores as well.

Two anecdotes testify to his enormous strength. First, during the Oval Test match of 1880 between England and Australia, he was out caught for two to a ball he had hit so high that by the time GF Grace had snaffled him, waiting directly underneath it on the boundary, he and his partner had almost completed their third run. "My heart stopped beating as I went on waiting [for the ball to come]," said Grace later.

On the next tour, in 1882, Bonnor made a £100 wager with a disbelieving fellow passenger on the SS Assam that he could, with his throw after stepping off the ship, send a cricket ball 100 yards: he won the wager by throwing the ball 119 yards and seven inches, done without a run up. WG Grace credits Bonnor with another throw of 130 yards, but legend has it that Grace himself threw even further in their one-on-one competition.

Measured hits of his in practice included ones at Melbourne of 160 and 149 yards, and one of 147 at Mitcham Common in May 1880, which was carefully measured by the famed bowler James Southerton. Bonnor also reached 160 yards in actual play when, at Longsight in 1880, the Australians played the local XVIII and he sent Grace's cousin, W.R. Gilbert, a long way.

In 1884, George Bonnor became the first player in Test cricket as well as international cricket history, to be dismissed hit wicket.

Bonnor died of a heart attack, aged 57, in Orange, New South Wales, and is buried at the cemetery there.

References

External links

1855 births
1912 deaths
Australia Test cricketers
Victoria cricketers
New South Wales cricketers
Melbourne Cricket Club cricketers
Australian cricketers
People from the Central Tablelands
Cricketers from New South Wales